Phostria tedea is a moth in the family Crambidae. It was described by Stoll in 1780. It is found in the southern United States, where it has been recorded from Arizona, to Central America, including Mexico, Costa Rica and Belize.

The wingspan is about 33 mm. Adults have been recorded on wing in August and September.

References

Phostria
Moths described in 1780
Moths of North America